James Storer (born 16 February 1982) is a Fiji international rugby league footballer who last played for the Port Kembla Blacks in the Group 7 Rugby League competition. He represented Fiji in three Rugby League World Cups.

Background
He is of Indigenous & Fijian heritage.

Playing career
Storer joined the St. George-Illawarra Dragons when aged 16. He left the club after the 2001 season.

In 2003 he played two National Rugby League games for the South Sydney Rabbitohs.

In 2006 he played for the Parramatta Eels in the NSWRL Premier League, scoring one try. Storer had also played for the Cronulla-Sutherland Sharks in the NSWRL Premier League.

He played for Fiji at the 2008 World Cup. After the tournament Storer suffered serious injuries to his left arm which forced him into early retirement. However, he made a comeback in 2013 and earned selection in Fiji's 2013 Rugby League World Cup squad.

In May 2014, Storer played for Fiji in the 2014 Pacific Rugby League International. He scored a try in Fiji's 32–16 defeat.

On 7 May 2016 Storer captained Fiji, for the first time, in the 2016 Melanesian Cup where he played at hooker in the 24–22 loss at Parramatta Stadium.

On 6 May 2017, Storer played in the Pacific Test against Tonga. Storer scored a try just moments after coming off the bench in the first half. Later that year, he was picked in the Fijian squad for the 2017 Rugby League World Cup.

Storer was the Captain/Coach of the Port Kembla Blacks before they withdrew from the South Coast Group 7 Competition at the end of 2017.

Storer runs a fitness boot camp called YUIN FITT just north of Wollongong.

References

External links 
 Fiji v France: Teams
2017 RLWC profile

1982 births
Living people
Australian Aboriginal rugby league team players
Australian people of Fijian descent
Australian rugby league coaches
Australian rugby league players
Fiji national rugby league team captains
Fiji national rugby league team players
Indigenous Australian rugby league players
Rugby league hookers
Rugby league players from Sydney
South Sydney Rabbitohs players